Long Hiệp may refer to several places in Vietnam, including:

Long Hiệp, Long An, a commune of Bến Lức District
Long Hiệp, Quảng Ngãi, a commune of Minh Long District
Long Hiệp, Trà Vinh, a commune of Trà Cú District